German submarine U-1011 was a Type VIIC/41 U-boat ordered by Nazi Germany's Kriegsmarine during World War II. Laid down on 12 March 1943, at Blohm & Voss, Hamburg, as yard number 211, the incomplete submarine fell victim to an RAF bombing raid on 25 July 1943. Planned repair work was cancelled on 22 July 1944.

Design
German Type VIIC/41 submarines were preceded by the heavier Type VIIC submarines. U-1011 had a displacement of  when at the surface and  while submerged. She had two shafts and two  propellers.

U-1011 was fitted with five  torpedo tubes (four fitted at the bow and one at the stern), fourteen torpedoes or 26 TMA or TMB Naval mines, one  SK C/35 naval gun, (220 rounds), one  Flak M42 and two  C/30 anti-aircraft guns. The boat had a complement of between forty-four and fifty-two.

See also
 Battle of the Atlantic

References

Bibliography

German Type VIIC/41 submarines
World War II submarines of Germany
Ships built in Hamburg